Thiotricha tetraphala is a species of moth in the family Gelechiidae. It was described by Edward Meyrick in 1885. It is endemic to New Zealand.

Taxonomy

This species was first described by Edward Meyrick in 1885 and named Thistricha tetraphala. In 1886 Meyrick gave a fuller description and corrected the misspelling of the genus name to Thiotricha. The male holotype specimen, collected in Dunedin, is held at the Natural History Museum, London.

Description
The wingspan is about 12 mm. The forewings are light grey, somewhat irrorated with grey-whitish in the disc. There are three dark grey spots, the first basal, the second triangular, in the disc before the middle, the third larger, oblong, beyond middle and resting on the submedian fold. The hindwings are grey.

References

Moths described in 1885
Thiotricha
Moths of New Zealand
Endemic fauna of New Zealand
Taxa named by Edward Meyrick
Endemic moths of New Zealand